The following sortable table comprises the 209 most topographically isolated mountain peaks of the United States of America (including its territories) with at least  of topographic prominence.

The summit of a mountain or hill may be measured in three principal ways:
The topographic elevation of a summit measures the height of the summit above a geodetic sea level.
The topographic prominence of a summit is a measure of how high the summit rises above its surroundings.
The topographic isolation (or radius of dominance) of a summit measures how far the summit lies from its nearest point of equal elevation.

In the United States, only Denali exceeds  of topographic isolation. 3 summits exceed , 8 exceed , 13 exceed , 47 exceed , 113 exceed , and 214 major summits exceed  of topographic isolation.



Most isolated major summits

The list below contains the 200 most isolated major summits in the 50 states and District of Columbia, plus an additional 9 major isolated summits in the U.S. territories, for a total of 209 summits.

Of these 209 most isolated major summits of the United States, 63 are located in Alaska, 19 in Montana, 16 in California, 14 in Utah, 13 in Nevada, 12 in Colorado, 12 in Arizona, 10 in Wyoming, 7 in Washington, 7 in Oregon, 6 in New Mexico, 5 in the Northern Mariana Islands, 4 in Hawaii, 3 in Idaho, 3 in Texas, 2 in North Carolina, 2 in Maine, 2 in New York, 2 in American Samoa, 2 in Puerto Rico, and one each in New Hampshire, Arkansas, South Dakota, Tennessee, Vermont, Virginia, and West Virginia.  Two of these summits lie on the international border between Alaska and British Columbia and one lies on the state border between Tennessee and North Carolina.

Gallery

See also

List of mountain peaks of North America
List of mountain peaks of Greenland
List of mountain peaks of Canada
List of mountain peaks of the Rocky Mountains
List of mountain peaks of the United States
List of the highest major summits of the United States
List of the major 4000-meter summits of the United States
List of the major 3000-meter summits of the United States
List of United States fourteeners
List of the most prominent summits of the United States
List of the ultra-prominent summits of the United States

List of the major 100-kilometer summits of the United States
List of mountain peaks of Alaska
List of mountain peaks of California
List of mountain peaks of Colorado
List of mountain peaks of Hawaii
List of mountain peaks of México
List of mountain peaks of Central America
List of mountain peaks of the Caribbean
United States of America
Geography of the United States
Geology of the United States
:Category:Mountains of the United States
commons:Category:Mountains of the United States
Physical geography
Topography
Topographic elevation
Topographic prominence
Topographic isolation

Notes

References

External links

United States Geological Survey (USGS)
Geographic Names Information System @ USGS
United States National Geodetic Survey (NGS)
Geodetic Glossary @ NGS
NGVD 29 to NAVD 88 online elevation converter @ NGS
Survey Marks and Datasheets @ NGS
Bivouac.com
Peakbagger.com
Peaklist.org
Peakware.com
Summitpost.org

 
Isolated
United States, List Of The Most Isolated Major Summits Of The